Amīnah al-Saʿīd also known as Amīnah Saʻīd (1914–1995) was an Egyptian journalist and women's rights activist. She founded Egypt's first women's magazine and was the first woman magazine editor in the Middle East.

Biography
Saʿīd was born on 20 January 1914 in Cairo, Egypt. She joined the youth wing of the Egyptian Feminist Union at the age of 14. She was among the first women to attend Fuad I University in 1931. She earned a degree in English literature in 1935. Saʿīd was opposed to veiling and played tennis in public without a veil. She joined the news magazine Al-Musawar as a columnist.

Saʿīd founded Hawaa in 1954. She was among the earliest full-time female journalists in the country. From 1958 to 1969 she was secretary general of the Pan-Arab League Women's Union. She became editor of Al-Musawar in 1973. From 1976 to 1985 she chaired the magazine's publishing group.

Saʿīd died of cancer at age 81 on 13 August 1995 in Cairo.

See also
Feminism in Egypt

References

20th-century Egyptian women writers
20th-century journalists
1914 births
1995 deaths
Cairo University alumni
Deaths from cancer in Egypt
Egyptian editors
Egyptian women journalists
Egyptian women's rights activists
Egyptian magazine founders
Journalists from Cairo
Women magazine editors